Lucas Buadés (born 28 December 1997) is a French professional footballer who plays as midfielder for Ligue 2 club Rodez.

Career
Buadés made his professional debut for Nîmes Olympique in a 1–0 Ligue 2 loss to LB Châteauroux on 21 August 2017. On 3 July 2019, he signed a professional contract with Nîmes. He extended his contract on 30 June 2020, keeping him at the club until 2022.

References

External links

Nîmes Profile

1997 births
Living people
People from Muret
Sportspeople from Haute-Garonne
French footballers
Footballers from Occitania (administrative region)
Association football midfielders
Ligue 1 players
Ligue 2 players
Championnat National 2 players
Championnat National 3 players
Nîmes Olympique players
Rodez AF players